Gibson is a station on the Long Island Rail Road's Far Rockaway Branch in the Gibson section of Valley Stream, in Nassau County, New York. The station is at Gibson Boulevard and Munro Boulevard. The station opened in May 1928.

Station layout
This station has two high-level side platforms, each 10 cars long.

References

External links 

 Station House from Google Maps Street View
 Platforms from Google Maps Street View

Long Island Rail Road stations in Nassau County, New York
Valley Stream, New York
Railway stations in the United States opened in 1928